Carlos Arturo Lett (November 4, 1885 - March 8, 1956) was an Argentine footballer who played as forward. Lett played most of his career in Alumni (where he won 16 titles) and the Argentina national team.

Biography
Lett joined Alumni in 1905 along to goalkeeper José Buruca Laforia. During the year of his debut with the team he became top scorer of the tournament with 15 goals. Alumni also won its 4th championship. In 1906 Alumni won another championship and Lett scored a goal in the final match where Alumni defeated Lomas by 5-0.

Lett played with Alumni until 1911 when the team was disbanded after winning its last title that same year.

With the Argentina national team Lett debuted on 15 August 1905 in a Copa Lipton match against Uruguay. Lett played again for Argentina five years later, in a friendly match against Chile.
Lett served with the Royal Field Artillery in World War I including seeing action in the Palestine Campaign in 1917-1918.
In October 1918 Lett married Valerie Helen Stears (21 March 1898 - 21 September 1941) and the couple had 7 children and they all lived between Argentina & England over the years.
Lett spent his last years with a daughter and her husband near Montreal, Canada.
He died on 8 March 1956.

Titles
(All of them won with Alumni):

National
 Argentine Primera División (6): 1905, 1906, 1907, 1909, 1910, 1911
 Copa de Competencia Jockey Club (3): 1907, 1908, 1909
 Copa de Honor Municipalidad de Buenos Aires (2): 1905, 1906

International
 Copa de Honor Cousenier (1): 1906
 Tie Cup (4): 1906, 1907, 1908, 1909

Individual honours
 Argentine Primera División topscorer (1): 1905 (12 goals)

References

1885 births
1956 deaths
Place of birth missing
Argentine footballers
Argentina international footballers
Argentine Primera División players
Alumni Athletic Club players
Association football midfielders